Nam yom (น้ำยม) is a watercourse in Thailand. Its source is located in the Phi Pan Nam Range. It is a tributary of the Yom River, which is part of the Chao Phraya River basin.

Ngim